Muckton is a village and former civil parish in the East Lindsey district of Lincolnshire, England. It is in the Lincolnshire Wolds, a designated Area of Outstanding Natural Beauty. It is in the civil parish of Burwell.

Muckton is mentioned in the Domesday Book of 1086 as "Muchetune", and is listed as having 9 households, with Ansgot of Burwell as Lord of the Manor.

The medieval church was dedicated to the Holy Trinity. It was rebuilt by James Fowler in 1878 although it retained its Norman chancel arch.  It was declared redundant in May 1981 by the Diocese of Lincoln, and demolished in October 1982.

It consists of ancient semi-natural woodland on a boulder clay soil.

The Greenwich Prime Zero meridian line passes through the parish.

References

External links

Villages in Lincolnshire
East Lindsey District
Nature reserves in Lincolnshire
Former civil parishes in Lincolnshire